Jonathan Bane (born September 4, 1991) is an American football quarterback for the San Antonio Gunslingers of the National Arena League (NAL). He played college football at Dakota Wesleyan.

Early years
Bane first played high school football for the Rogers High School Eagles of Rogers, Texas before transferring to play for the Temple High School Wildcats of Temple, Texas. He left Rogers his junior year due to a disagreement with the head coach. He was ruled ineligible for varsity sports for a year by the University Interscholastic League. Bane then played on Temple's junior varsity team and did not appear in any varsity games until the final contest of his senior season and an ensuing playoff game. He then signed to play football at Trinity Valley Community College. He was in a car crash his senior year that severely hampered his ability to walk. Bane was not in college his first year out of high school.

College career
Bane played for the Dakota Wesleyan Tigers of Dakota Wesleyan University from 2010 to 2013. He threw for 1,920 yards and 12 touchdowns in 2010, 2,817 yards and 28 touchdowns in 2011, 2,157 yards and 18 touchdowns in 2012 and 2,330 yards and 25 touchdowns in 2013. He completed 744 of 1,360 passes for 83 touchdowns and a school record 9,224 yards during his college career. Bane set school records for passing yards in a game with 457, longest pass in a game with 99 yards and most passing yards in a season with 2,817. He also earned Second Team All-GPAC honors in 2011 and Honorable Mention All-GPAC accolades in 2012 and 2013.

Professional career

Richmond Raiders
Bane signed with the Richmond Raiders of the Professional Indoor Football League (PIFL) in May 2014 and played for the team from 2014 to 2015. He was named the PIFL Offensive Player of the Year in 2015 after completing 221 passes for 2,759 yards and 55 touchdowns. He also garnered First Team All-PIFL accolades. Bane helped the Raiders advance to the PIFL championship game in 2015, where they lost to the Columbus Lions.

Tampa Bay Storm
Bane was assigned to the Tampa Bay Storm of the Arena Football League (AFL) on February 22, 2016. He made his AFL debut on April 1, 2016, against the Orlando Predators in relief of starter Adam Kennedy, completing five of eight passes for 65 yards with a touchdown and an interception. He made his first career AFL start on May 1, 2016, completing 21 of 38 passes for 281 yards and three touchdowns in a 33–27 loss to the Jacksonville Sharks. On May 12, 2016, Bane was placed on recallable reassignment.

Bismarck Bucks
On February 21, 2017, Bane was signed by the Bismarck Bucks of the CIF. He played in seven games for the Bucks, completing 116 of 210 passes for 1,342 yards, 28 touchdowns and 5 interceptions. He also scored three rushing touchdowns. He was placed on injured reserve on May 17, 2017.

December 5, 2017, he was announced as the inaugural player signing for the Maine Mammoths of the National Arena League (NAL).

Jacksonville Sharks
On February 21, 2019, Bane signed with the Jacksonville Sharks. Bane led the National Arena League in passing yards and passing TDs through week 8, before being injured and placed on IR. Bane later returned to the sharks for the playoffs, against the Columbus Lions, Going 14-14 207 yds and throwing 5 TDs for a huge victory taking the sharks to the NAL Championship Game. 2019 National Arena League Champion.

Frisco Fighters
Bane had signed with the Frisco Fighters for their inaugural 2020 season in the Indoor Football League.  After the 2020 season was cancelled because of the COVID-19 pandemic, Bane re-signed with the Fighters for the 2021 season.

Carolina Cobras
On November 4, 2021, Bane signed with the Carolina Cobras of the National Arena League (NAL).

San Antonio Gunslingers
On November 1, 2022, Bane signed with the San Antonio Gunslingers of the National Arena League (NAL).

References

External links
NFL Draft profile

Living people
1991 births
American football quarterbacks
Dakota Wesleyan Tigers football players
Richmond Raiders players
Tampa Bay Storm players
Colorado Crush (IFL) players
Bismarck Bucks players
High Country Grizzlies players
Maine Mammoths players
Jacksonville Sharks players
Players of American football from Texas
People from Temple, Texas
Temple High School (Texas) alumni